David Löfquist (born 6 August 1986) is a Swedish footballer who plays as a winger and striker for Mjällby AIF. His nickname is "Löken" (''English: "The Onion").

Career

Mjällby AIF 
Löfquist started his professional career at Mjällby AIF where he played for five seasons. The three first seasons was in Sweden's second highest tier of football, Superettan, while the last two seasons was in Sweden's highest league, Allsvenskan. Löfquist managed to play more than 130 league matches for Mjällby before he left the club in early 2012.

Parma 
On 5 December 2011 it was announced that Löfquist had signed a two-and-a-half-year-long contract with Italian side Parma with an option to further extend the contract with two years in the summer of 2014.

Loan to Gubbio 
Before Löfquist had played for Parma he was loaned out to Serie B side Gubbio on 31 January 2012 for the remainder of the 2011–12 season.

Loan to Malmö FF 
On the last day of the transfer window, 31 August 2012, Löfquist signed a loan deal with Allsvenskan club Malmö FF for the rest of the 2012 season. Löfquist only appeared in four league matches for Malmö FF during the loan spell.

Career statistics

Honours

Club

Mjällby AIF 

 Superettan: 2009, 2019

References

External links 
 Malmö FF profile 
 

1986 births
Living people
Swedish footballers
Mjällby AIF players
Parma Calcio 1913 players
A.S. Gubbio 1910 players
Malmö FF players
Odense Boldklub players
Allsvenskan players
Superettan players
Serie B players
Danish Superliga players
Swedish expatriate footballers
Expatriate footballers in Italy
Expatriate men's footballers in Denmark
Association football forwards
Association football midfielders